The Chadwick was a historic apartment building located at Indianapolis, Indiana. It featured Tuscan order engaged columns at the entrance. It was destroyed by fire in January 2011.

It was listed on the National Register of Historic Places in 1983 and delisted in 2011.

References

Former National Register of Historic Places in Indiana
Residential buildings on the National Register of Historic Places in Indiana
Residential buildings completed in 1925
Georgian Revival architecture in Indiana
Residential buildings in Indianapolis
National Register of Historic Places in Indianapolis
Demolished buildings and structures in Indiana
Buildings and structures demolished in 2011